Hugo Sebastián Santacruz Villalba (born 6 February 1989 in Yasy Cañy, Paraguay) is a Paraguayan footballer currently playing for Club Rubio Ñu.

References

External links

Living people
1989 births
Paraguayan footballers
Paraguayan expatriate footballers
Club Libertad footballers
Club Atlético 3 de Febrero players
General Caballero Sport Club footballers
Expatriate footballers in Peru
Association football forwards